Robert Saggers (born 5 August 1965) is a former Australian rules footballer who played with the Sydney Swans and North Melbourne in the Victorian Football League (VFL).

Saggers, an Altona City recruit, made two appearances for Sydney late in the 1985 VFL season. A forward, he transferred to North Melbourne in 1986 and played three games for the club that year.

References

1965 births
Australian rules footballers from Victoria (Australia)
Sydney Swans players
North Melbourne Football Club players
Living people